Qobuüstü is a village and municipality in the Agdash Rayon of Azerbaijan. It has a population of 1,345.  The municipality consists of the villages of Qobuüstü and Yeniarx.

References

Populated places in Agdash District